Sunrisers Hyderabad (SRH) are a franchise cricket team based in Hyderabad, India, which plays in the Indian Premier League (IPL). They were one of the eight teams that competed in the 2017 Indian Premier League, making their fifth outing in all IPL tournaments. The team was captained by David Warner and coached by Tom Moody with Simon Helmot as assistant coach, Muttiah Muralitharan as bowling coach and VVS Laxman as mentor. The Sunrisers drew an average home attendance of 26,000 in the 2017 IPL season. 

They entered this edition as the defending champions and started their campaign against the Royal Challengers Bangalore on 5 April 2017 on a winning note. They qualified for playoffs but got lost to the Kolkata Knight Riders in Eliminator finishing fourth at the end of the tournament. Warner won the Orange Cap in the 2017 IPL by scoring 641 runs and Bhuvneshwar Kumar's 26 wickets won him the Purple Cap.

Player acquisition

Retention
The Sunrisers Hyderabad retained 17 players and released 6 players from their 2016 squad. They went into the 2017 IPL auction with the remaining salary cap of

Player auction
The player auction for the season was held on 20 February 2017 in Bangalore with more than 750 players having registered for the auction. The Sunrisers Hyderabad ended the auction with an addition of 8 players to their squad spending .

Retained Players David Warner, Shikhar Dhawan, Moises Henriques, Ben Cutting, Deepak Hooda, Yuvraj Singh, Kane Williamson, Vijay Shankar, Naman Ojha, Bhuvneshwar Kumar, Barinder Sran, Ashish Nehra, Abhimanyu Mithun, Siddarth Kaul, Bipul Sharma, Mustafizur Rahman and Ricky Bhui

Released players Trent Boult, Eoin Morgan, Aditya Tare, Tirumalasetti Suman, Karn Sharma and Ashish Reddy

Added Players Mohammad Nabi, Rashid Khan, Chris Jordan, Tanmay Agarwal, Ben Laughlin, Mohammed Siraj, Eklavya Dwivedi and Pravin Tambe

Squad 
 Players with international caps are listed in bold.

Administration and support staff

Kit manufacturers and sponsors

Opening ceremony 

Opening ceremony was held on 5 April 2017 at their home, Rajiv Gandhi International Cricket Stadium, Hyderabad. At the opening ceremony four former Indian cricket players Sachin Tendulkar, Virender Sehwag, Sourav Ganguly and V.V.S. Laxman were felicitated. Bollywood actress Amy Jackson also performed in the ceremony.

Season overview

League stage
Standings

Results by match

Playoff stage

Fixtures

League stage

Playoff Stage

Eliminator

Statistics 

Full Table on Cricinfo
 Last updated: 19 May 2017

Awards and achievements

Awards
 Man of the Match

Season Awards
 Winner of Orange Cap: David Warner
 Winner of Purple Cap: Bhuvneshwar Kumar
 Vitara Brezza Glam Shot of the year: Yuvraj Singh

Achievements
 Second team after Chennai Super Kings in 2013 Indian Premier League to win both Orange Cap and Purple Cap.
 Warner becomes the First player to score 100+ as a captain and also for SRH
 Warner scores the highest score as a captain in all the IPL seasons.
 Most fours scored in the 2017 IPL: Warner (63)
 Fastest century in the 2017 IPL: Warner (43 balls)
 Highest score in the 2017 IPL: Warner (126)
 Most four wickets in the 2017 IPL: Siddarth Kaul (1)

Reaction
The 2017 season performances helped the IPL see its brand value jump by 26% to the estimated value of 5.3 billion. The SunRisers also saw the increase in their brand value by 37% to 56 million in 2017, according to Duff & Phelps.

See also
List of Sunrisers Hyderabad records

References

External links
Sunrisers Hyderabad official website

Sunrisers Hyderabad seasons
Cricket in Hyderabad, India
2017 Indian Premier League